The 1970 Paris–Roubaix was the 68th edition of the Paris–Roubaix cycle race and was held on 12 April 1970. The race started in Compiègne and finished in Roubaix. The race was won by Eddy Merckx of the Faemino–Faema team.

General classification

References

Paris–Roubaix
Paris-Roubaix
Paris-Roubaix
Paris-Roubaix
Paris-Roubaix